This is a list of sports podcasts.

Entries are ordered by their released dates of the first episode.

List 

=== 2004 ===
The Penalty Box - Xtrera Podcasting Network (August)
The Dan Le Batard Show with Stugotz (September 1)

2005

2006 
Football Weekly (May 11)
The Game (September)

2007 
Fantasy Focus
The Football Ramble (April)
The Dan Patrick Show (October 1)

2010 
Men in Blazers
Roker Report (December)

2011 
Me1 vs Me2 Snooker with Richard Herring (December)

2012 
The Tennis Podcast

2013 
The Dale Jr. Download (February 18)

2014 
Low Blows (April)
The Bill Simmons Podcast

2015 
Fantasy Footballers
The Fighter and the Kid
Dear Hank & John (June 7)
Dinner with Racers (November 18)

2016 
The Nine Club
Pardon My Take (February 29)
Athletico Mince (March 8)
drei90 (May 27)
Set Piece Menu (December 9)

2017 
The Totally Football Show
30 for 30 Podcasts (June 27)
The Indy Football Podcast (July 31)
Quickly Kevin, Will He Score? (February 23)

2019 

 The Anfield Wrap

See also 
List of skateboarding podcasts

References 

https://www.courant.com/news/connecticut/hc-xpm-2005-03-20-0503200540-story.html

Lists of podcasts